The 1916–17 Drexel Blue and Gold men's basketball team represented Drexel Institute of Art, Science and Industry during the 1916–17 men's basketball season. The Blue and Gold, led by 3rd year head coach E.L. Lucas, played their home games at Main Building.

Roster

Schedule

|-
!colspan=9 style="background:#F8B800; color:#002663;"| Regular season
|-

References

Drexel Dragons men's basketball seasons
Drexel
1916 in sports in Pennsylvania
1917 in sports in Pennsylvania